Francisco José Ventoso Alberdi (born 6 May 1982) is a Spanish former professional road racing cyclist, who rode professionally between 2004 and 2020, for the , , ,  and  squads.

Career
He won the 2010 Paris–Brussels in a bunch sprint. On the back his victory in the one-day classic and 3 other stage wins, he was included in the Spanish squad to ride at the World Championships in Geelong.

Major results

2004
 1st Stage 1 Tour of Qatar
2005
 4th Trofeo Luis Puig
2006
 1st Stage 3 Vuelta a España
 1st Stage 4a Euskal Bizikleta
2007
 4th Gent–Wevelgem
 10th Overall Vuelta a Castilla y León
1st Stages 2, 3 & 5
2008
 1st Stage 3 Vuelta a Castilla y León
 4th Overall Vuelta a La Rioja
1st Stage 1
2009
 1st  Overall Cinturó de l'Empordà
1st Stages 1 & 2
 1st  Overall Tour of Hainan
1st Stage 4
 1st  Overall Paris–Corrèze
 1st Gran Premio Bruno Beghelli
 1st Stage 1 Tour du Gévaudan Languedoc-Roussillon
 1st Stage 2 Vuelta a la Comunidad de Madrid
2010
 1st Paris–Brussels
 1st Stage 5 Vuelta a Andalucía
 1st Stage 2 Ster Elektrotoer
 1st Stage 2 Vuelta a la Comunidad de Madrid
2011
 Vuelta a Castilla y León
1st  Points classification
1st Stages 1 & 2
 1st Stage 6 Giro d'Italia
 1st Stage 5 Tour Down Under
 1st Stage 3 Vuelta a Andalucía
 2nd Trofeo Palma de Mallorca
2012
 1st  Road race, National Road Championships
 1st Stage 9 Giro d'Italia
 1st Stage 4 Circuit de la Sarthe
 1st Stage 5 Tour du Poitou-Charentes
2013
 5th Trofeo Palma de Mallorca
 5th Gran Premio Nobili Rubinetterie
 6th Trofeo Campos–Santanyí–Ses Salines
 6th Clásica de Almería
 8th GP Ouest–France
2014
 2nd Trofeo Muro-Port d'Alcúdia
 3rd Gran Premio Nobili Rubinetterie
 4th Clásica de Almería
 8th Trofeo Ses Salines
2017
 1st Stage 1 (TTT) Vuelta a España

Grand Tour general classification results timeline

References

External links

Official profile at 

1982 births
Living people
People from Reinosa
Spanish male cyclists
Cyclists from Cantabria
Spanish Vuelta a España stage winners
Spanish Giro d'Italia stage winners
Cyclists at the 2012 Summer Olympics
Olympic cyclists of Spain